Marie-Josée Coulombe (born 1965) is a Canadian sculptor.

Her work is included in the collection of the Musée national des beaux-arts du Québec and the City of Ottawa public art collection

References

Living people
1965 births
20th-century Canadian women artists
21st-century Canadian women artists
Université Laval alumni